Lyon Township is a township in Cloud County, Kansas, USA.  As of the 2000 census, its population was 103.

History
Lyon Township was originally called Fowler Township (in honor of a pioneer settler), and under the latter name was organized in April, 1872. About a month later it was renamed for General Nathaniel Lyon.

Geography

References

 USGS Geographic Names Information System (GNIS)

External links
 US-Counties.com
 City-Data.com

Townships in Cloud County, Kansas
Townships in Kansas
Populated places established in 1872
1872 establishments in Kansas